The 1908 Quebec general election was held on June 8, 1908, to elect members of the 12th Legislative Assembly of the Province of Quebec, Canada. The incumbent Quebec Liberal Party, led by Lomer Gouin, was re-elected, defeating the Quebec Conservative Party, led by Pierre-Évariste Leblanc.

Results

See also
 List of Quebec premiers
 Politics of Quebec
 Timeline of Quebec history
 List of Quebec political parties
 12th Legislative Assembly of Quebec

Notes

References

Further reading
 

Quebec general election
Elections in Quebec
General election
Quebec general election